The Trouble with Tracy is a Canadian television series produced by CTV for the 1970–1971 television season, with intended distribution by the U.S.-based National General Pictures. It is considered by some to be one of the worst situation comedies ever produced.

The series was produced as a daily show, and aired weekday afternoons at 3:30 pm from September 14, 1970. The economic and time pressures of producing 130 episodes in a single season (seven shows were filmed every five days) meant cheap, wobbly sets, no outdoor filming, a laugh track instead of a live studio audience, the use of single takes, the reuse of 25-year-old radio scripts, and other shortcuts that resulted in a poor-quality show. Even flubbed lines and bloopers sometimes ended up airing, because the show could not afford retakes.

Premise

Shot in Toronto at the studios of CFTO-TV, the show was set in New York City and featured a newlywed couple. Tracy Young (Diane Nyland) was wife to Doug Young (Steve Weston), a young advertising executive and exasperated husband. Other regular characters were Doug's hippie brother-in-law Paul (Franz Russell), who was constantly asking Doug for money, and Tracy's nagging mother, Mrs. Sherwood (Sylvia Lennick).

The show was based on scripts written by Goodman Ace for the 1930 to 1945 American radio comedy Easy Aces, though the story was updated by making Tracy's brother a hippie and the addition of other topical references. In addition, the show's pilot was originally titled The Married Youngs, a play on The Young Marrieds, focusing on the Youngs' last name; however, when the show went to series, producer Seymour Berns changed the name to The Trouble with Tracy, after his daughter, Tracy.

The show aired Monday to Friday, with 130 episodes produced for its original run. These episodes were repeated in the afternoon time slot until late into the 1970s.

Context

The Trouble with Tracy is often considered to have been produced solely to meet the demands of the Canadian content regulations. Cultural critics, including Geoff Pevere, have suggested, however, that as unsuccessful as the result was, the show deserves some credit as one of the first truly ambitious attempts to create a scripted television series within the financial constraints that have often plagued Canadian television production.

While American television networks have both the financial scale and the diversity of programming to take a loss on an unpopular series by cancelling it early, CTV had little choice but to air the entire series, regardless of its ratings or quality, in order to recoup as much of its investment as possible. The network was still in a precarious financial position, having only modestly recovered from its near-bankruptcy in 1965, and still had neither the national reach nor the audience of CBC Television. Furthermore, the network was running as a cooperative of its affiliated stations — meaning that network programming had to be funded and produced by individual stations, in a manner more comparable to the United States' PBS or Britain's ITV than to modern expectations of a commercial television network.

The largest real difference between The Trouble with Tracy and a poorly received American show, in fact, is that because of the above factors, it lasted longer, and had more time to become remembered than an American series of similar quality would have. In fact, just one year earlier, ABC had cancelled Turn-On, also commonly named as one of the worst shows in television history, after just a single episode — and some ABC affiliates did not even wait that long, pulling the show during a commercial break before the first episode had even finished airing.

By contrast, while The Trouble with Tracy at least represented a sincere attempt on CTV's part, many Canadian radio stations during the same era were responding to the new Canadian content regulations by burying Canadian music in obscure time slots known as "beaver hours".

Ongoing influence in Canadian popular culture
In his book, TV North: Everything You Ever Wanted to Know About Canadian Television, Peter Kenter says "The Trouble With Tracy is universally considered the worst Canadian TV show of all time, especially by those who have never seen it." With re-runs airing as late as 1990 on cable (albeit primarily in tricky time slots, such as early mornings before Canada AM, that needed to be filled inexpensively) the show became something of a cult favourite to a whole generation of Canadian viewers, especially those who first saw it as teenagers.

The Canadian rock band Barenaked Ladies featured a song called "The Trouble With Tracy" on one of their early demo tapes in 1988. Other than the title, the song has nothing to do with the TV show.

In March 2003, The Comedy Network, a Canadian specialty channel owned by CTV, announced that it would air a pilot for new version of The Trouble with Tracy, based on the original scripts, on April 1 of that year. If successful, this pilot would have led to a 13-episode series starring comedian Laurie Elliott as Tracy and David Lipovitch 
as Doug. Elliott and Lipovitch participated in a press conference to promote the new production. The actress who played the original Tracy, Diane Nyland Proctor, herself joined this advance media campaign and conducted interviews for the press.

The Comedy Network held the press conference in mid-March, and Nyland did her interviews at around the same time.  The entire press tour was, however, advance setup for an April Fool's prank, and the actual "pilot" consisted solely of a brief intro that segued into an episode of The Gavin Crawford Show. Perhaps not expecting an April Fool's joke to be set up in March, some media, including the Toronto Star and CTV's own Canada AM, had fallen for the prank.

See also

 The Starlost – another Canadian-produced series that faced similar budgetary and production challenges.
 List of sitcoms notable for negative reception
 Old time radio

References

External links

CTV Television Network original programming
1970 Canadian television series debuts
1971 Canadian television series endings
1970s Canadian sitcoms
Television shows set in New York City
Television series by Warner Bros. Television Studios
Television shows filmed in Toronto